The Araya Peninsula is a peninsula on the Caribbean Sea, located in Sucre State, northern Venezuela.

The peninsula is part of the eastern Serranía del Litoral mountain range, in the Venezuelan Coastal Ranges System of the northern Andes.  It extends eastward from the coastline. The town of Araya is located on its westernmost extremity.

The western tip of the Araya Peninsula is known for its large, purple-colored natural salt pans, which became a major site of salt mining during the colonial era. In the late 16th and early 17th centuries, the region was regularly mined for salt by Dutch smugglers, who reportedly numbered one hundred ships annually. The smuggling industry in the region was temporarily stymied by a Spanish punitive expedition sent in 1605, although it soon recovered. Eventually, in 1618, Spanish forces began constructing the fortress El Castillo de Santiago de Araya to guard the peninsula. When it was completed in 1665, the fortress permanently put an end to Dutch incursions.

The salt mines of the Araya Peninsula were the setting of the award-winning 1959 documentary film Araya by filmmaker Margot Benacerraf.

See also 
Cariaco Basin
Paria Peninsula

References

External links
 Images of the Araya Peninsula.

Peninsulas of Venezuela
Geography of Sucre (state)
Venezuelan Coastal Range